Joseph G. Marina  is an American Catholic priest and Jesuit who is currently the president of the University of Scranton.

Early life 
Marina was born in [Phillipsburg, New Jersey]. He studied at St. John's University, where he received a bachelor's degree in physics and a master's degree in secondary education. He then received a doctorate in administration and supervision from Fordham University. After entering the Society of Jesus, he received a Master of Divinity and Master of Theology from the Boston College School of Theology and Ministry.

Marina was ordained a priest on June 9, 2012, by Cardinal Edward Egan, the Archbishop Emeritus of New York, at the Fordham University Church.

In 2016, Marina became the provost and vice president for academic affairs at Le Moyne College, where he was also a professor of education. Prior to that, he was an associate provost, special assistant to the president, and the interim chairman of the education department.

University of Scranton 
Marina was elected by the university's board of trustees as the 29th president of the university on February 9, 2021, succeeding Jeffrey Gingerich, who became acting president upon the death of Scott Pilarz. Marina took office on June 14, 2021.

References 

Living people
Presidents of the University of Scranton
St. John's University (New York City) alumni
Fordham University alumni
Boston College School of Theology and Ministry alumni
20th-century American Jesuits
21st-century American Jesuits
Le Moyne College faculty
Year of birth missing (living people)